Mohammad-Reza Darvishi (born 17 October 1955 in Shiraz) is an Iranian musician, researcher, and author of Encyclopedia of the Musical Instruments of Iran, a Klaus P. Wachsmann Prize-winner book about Iranian musical instruments.

Works

Music

Film music 
A selection of M. R. Darvishi's film scores
 2012 Parinaz
 2009 Mizak (meaning: My mother)
 2009 The White Meadows (Persian: Keshtzārhā-ye sepid)
 2009 When we are all Asleep (Persian: Vaqti hame xābim)
 2008 The green fire (Persian: Ātash-e sabz)
 2008 Lady of the Roses (documentary)
 2006 Crossing the Dust
 2006 Slowly... (Persian: Be ahestegi...)
 2006 The Talking Carpet (Persian: Qali-e soxangu) (documentary short)
 2004 Stray Dogs
 2003 Joy of Madness (documentary)
 2003  Two Angels
 2003 Osama 
 2003 At Five in the Afternoon
 2002 11'09"01 September 11(segment "Iran")  
 2002 The Afghan Alphabeth (Persian: Alefba-ye Afqān) (documentary)
 2001 Kandahar (Persian: Safar-e Qandehār)
 2001 The Unfinished Song
 2000 The Day I Became a Woman (Persian: Ruzi ke zan shodam)
 2000 Blackboards (Persian: Taxt-e siyāh)
 1998 A Bag of Rice (Persian: Kise-ye berenj)

Music for theatre plays 

 2003 Shab-e hezār-o-yekom (The One Thousand and First Night)
 2004 Afrā yā Ruz migozarad (Afra, or the day passes)
 2005 Majles-e shabih. Dar zekr-e masāyeb-e ostād Navid Mākān va hamsarash mohandes-e Roxshid-e Farzin (Mourning Play. About the Sufferings of Professor Navid Makan and his Wife, architect Rokhshid Farzin)

Tapes and CDs 
Some of his Cassettes and CDs are:
 In the memory of Eqbāl (Prelude for piano). Tehrān: Harp, 1984
 Morning Melody (Trio for 2 clarinets and piano). Tehrān: Arvin, 1997
 Abdolqāder Marāqi, Shouqnāme
 Mazandarani Music, for song and orchestra, song by Abolhassan Khoshroo and Nourolah Alizadeh, 1983
 Winter, for song and symphonic orchestra, song by Shahram Nazeri
 The season of flower, for song and symphonic orchestra, song by Iraj Bastami 
 The aster dome, for song and orchestra, sung by Mohammad Reza Shajariyan (a joint work with Parviz Meshkatian)
 The soul of the lovers, for song and orchestra, sung by Mohammad Reza Shajariyan (a joint work with Parviz Meshkatian)
 Music album of seven thrones (A collection of 4 cassettes from the music of Iran regions along with the book)
 Music album of north of Khorasan (A collection of 3 cassettes from the music of north of Khorasan along with the book)
 Mirror and song, music album (A collection of 28 cassettes with the melody and religious music from various regions of Iran with the book)
 Bag of rice: Music from the movies: “Bag of rice”, “The song of the Nimvar Field” and “Karde”, 1999
 Music from the movies: “The Blackboard” & “The day I became a woman”, 2001
 Zaman = Era, 2019

Selected bibliography 

 (1984) Bist tarāne-ye mahalli-ye Fārs (Twenty traditional songs from Fars). Tehrān: Harp; later: Mahoor: 1994
 (1991) Haft ourang (Seven throne - a collection of articles on regional music of Iran). Tehrān: Art Center
 (1994) Negāh be qarb : bahsi dar ta'sir-e musiqi-ye Qarb bar musiqi-ye Irān (Westward look : a discussion on the impact of Western music on the (sic) Iranian music : an analytical survey). Tehrān: Māhoor
 (1994) Sonnat va bigānegi-ye farhang dar musiqi-ye Irān (Tradition and cultural alienation in music of Iran). Tehran: Māhur
 (1994) Moqaddamei bar shenāxt-e musiqi-ye navāhi-ye Irān. Daftar-e naxost: Manāteq-e jonub (Hormozgān, Khuzestān) (An introduction presentation of regional music from Irān. First book: Hormozgan, Boushehr, Khouzestan). Tehrān: Māhur 
 (1994) Dar bāre-ye honar va adabiyāt (About art and literature; Mohammad Reza Darvishi in conversation with Naser Hariri). Tehrān: Āvishan, Gouharzād
 (1997) Nourouzxāni (Norouz Singing - Songs for Nouruz and Spring from various regions of Iran). Tehrān: Arvin, 62 p.
 (1998) Āiine va āvāz (Mirror and awaz singing; a collection of articles about the traditional music of Iran from various regions). Tehrān: Art Center
 (1999) Musiqi va xalse : zekrhā-ye marāsem-e Gowāti-ye Baluchestān (Music and Trance: The Govati ceremony citations of Balochistan). Tehrān: Māhour, 55 p.
 (2001) Az miyān-e sorudhā va sokuthā : gozide-ye neweshtār wa goftār-e... (From among song and silence : a selection from the writings and lectures of...). Tehrān: Māhur, 296 p.
 (2001) Dāyerat’ol-ma’āref-e sāzhā-ye Irān. Jeld 1: Sāzhā-ye zehi-ye mezrābi va ārshei-ye navāhi-ye Irān = Encyclopedia of the Musical Instruments of Iran. Vol. 1. Chordophones in Regional Music. Tehrān: Māhoor
 (2005) Dāyerat’ol-ma’āref-e sāzhā-ye Irān. Jeld 2: Pustsedāhā va xodsedāhā-ye navāhi-ye Irān = Encyclopedia of the Musical Instruments of Iran. Vol. 2. Membranophones and Idiophones of Regional Music. Tehrān: Māhoor
 (2009) Sāzshenāsi-ye irāni (Acquaintance with Iranian musical instruments). Tehān, 256 p. - together with Arfa' Atrāii
 Goftegu bā Mohammad Rezā Darvishi dar bāre-ye musiqi-ye Irān (Conversation with Mohammad Reza Darvishi about Iranian music)
 Jāmedarān : selsele-ye mu-ye dust
 Leyli kojāst : ta'amolāt-e kutāh wa parākande dar musiqi va farhang (Where is Leyli : Brief and dispersed reflections on music and culture) 
 Musiqi-ye hamāsi-ye Irān : gozide-ye maqālāt (Epic music of Iran : selected articles). (ed.)
 Mousum-Gol

Awards 
 October 2002 - SEM’s (Society for Ethnomusicology) award for the best publication of the year on musical instruments, granted by Bruno Nettl, for The Encyclopaedia of the Iranina Musical Instruments, vol.1 
 2000, The music for Kandahar (2001 film) (directed by Mohsen Makhmalbaf) was nominated the best foreign film music, among the others, by Bonn biennial festival of film music, Germany.
 2005, Nomination for achievement of UNESCO’s award for the greatest musician worldwide.

Films about Darvishi 
 Leyli kojast, directed by Mohammad Shirvani, a documentary about Darvishi’s professional career on the occasion of his 2005 nomination for the UNESCO’s award for the greatest musician worldwide.

References

External links 
 
 An extended interview with M.R. Darvishi, his biography, music samples, scores etc., in Persian (artebox.ir)

20th-century Iranian musicians
1955 births
Iranian musicologists
Living people
21st-century Iranian musicians